Ira Hall (2 February 1892, Martinsville, Indiana – 6 February 1987, Tarpon Springs, Florida) was an American racecar driver. Hall was later elected sheriff of Vigo County, Indiana.

Career
Though Hall had several starts in the Indianapolis 500, his greatest fame was gained on the dirt tracks of the Midwest, primarily Indiana and Illinois. He reportedly winning as many as 100 races in a season on what was known as "the suicide circuit." He was seriously injured in the fall of 1927 at George Rogers Clark Speedway near Vincennes, Ind., Speedway, but recovered to return to racing the next year.

Hall was inducted in the National Sprint Car Hall of Fame in 1993.

Indy 500 results

References

1892 births
1987 deaths
Indianapolis 500 drivers
National Sprint Car Hall of Fame inductees
People from Martinsville, Indiana
Racing drivers from Indiana